Theresa Maria Josepha Martha (28 July 1850, Schloss Liechtenstein – 13 March 1938, Munich) was a Princess of Liechtenstein and of Bavaria.

Family
Theresa was the tenth child and ninth daughter of Aloys II, Prince of Liechtenstein and his wife, Countess Franziska Kinsky of Wchinitz and Tettau. She was a younger sister of Johann II, Prince of Liechtenstein and an older sister of Franz I, Prince of Liechtenstein.

Marriage
On 12 April 1882, in Vienna, Theresa married Prince Arnulf of Bavaria, youngest son of Luitpold, Prince Regent of Bavaria and Archduchess Auguste Ferdinande of Austria. They had one child, Prince Heinrich of Bavaria (1884–1916), who died in the First World War. She is buried in the Theatinerkirche in Munich.

Ancestry

1850 births
1938 deaths
Liechtenstein princesses
Bavarian princesses
House of Wittelsbach
Burials at the Theatine Church, Munich
19th-century Liechtenstein women
19th-century Liechtenstein people
Daughters of monarchs